The Norwegian Anglican Church, sometimes known as the Whalers Church, and as the Norwegian Lutheran Church (until 2013), and casually as the Grytviken Church, is a church in Grytviken, South Georgia, built in 1913. The church was part of the Church of Norway for a century from 1913 to 2013. It was formally handed over to the Church of England (national church of England) in 2013, and is now part of the Anglican Communion's Diocese of the Falkland Islands.

History and architecture
The Neo-Gothic church was pre-built in Norway and erected in Grytviken by whalers led by Carl Anton Larsen around 1912–1913. The church consists of a single nave leading to a small altar. A small library is attached to the side near the altar. Inside, worshippers (and now visitors) are seated on long wood benches. The floor's dark wood planks contrast with the white walls and ceiling.

The church, one of the world's southernmost churches, was consecrated on Christmas Day in 1913. In 1922, a funeral service for Sir Ernest Shackleton was conducted in the church before his burial amongst 64 others in the church cemetery.

Pastor
The church was led by Kristen Løken, from 1913 to 1914. Løken was born in 1885 in Lillehammer in Norway. He was made Pastor of South Georgia, and arrived in 1912 to take up his post. He was responsible for supervising the building of the church building, and left his church in 1914, and was the only pastor for this church. He died in 1975.

Grytviken Cemetery
It predates the church, first accepting whalers' graves before 1902. It holds 64 graves, including nine victims of a 1912 typhoid epidemic, Sir Ernest Shackleton (1874–1922), the ashes of fellow polar explorer Frank Wild (1873–1939) which were interred in 2011, and Félix Artuso, an Argentinian submarine officer who was killed in the 1982 British recapture of South Georgia from Argentina.

Restoration and maintenance

In April 1982, during the invasion of South Georgia by Argentinian military forces, members of a British Antarctic Survey team were invited by some Royal Marines to take shelter in the church.

After years of abandonment and weathering the harsh elements of the region (the roof was damaged in 1994), the church was renovated by the keepers of South Georgia Museum and volunteers in 1996–1998, and now serves for occasional church services and marriage ceremonies.

In popular culture
The church had a cameo appearance in the 2006 animated film Happy Feet.

See also
 Trinity Church (Antarctica) located south of Grytviken in Antarctica
 South Georgia Museum – one of a few active structures in town
 Løken Pond – named for the church's only pastor

References

External links

 Grytviken Cemetery
 

20th-century Church of Norway church buildings
20th-century Church of England church buildings
Buildings and structures in South Georgia and the South Sandwich Islands
Churches in Antarctica
Churches completed in 1913
Norwegian diaspora
1913 establishments in the British Empire
1913 establishments in Antarctica